Yury Matveyevich Bayakovsky (5 November 1937 -  17 June 2014) was a Soviet and Russian scientist in the field of Computer graphics, Candidate of Sciences.

Biography 
He was born in 1928 in the Lobva.

In 1960 he graduated from the Moscow Power Engineering Institute, Faculty of Automation and Computer Engineering. After graduation I went to work at the Institute of Applied Mathematics of the USSR Academy of Sciences in the position of computer engineer "M-20".

He participated in the debugging of the machine "Spring" and preparing it for state tests.

In the late 1960s, under the guidance of Bayakovsky, the development of a graphic programs library on Fortran Grafor began.

In 1990 he was admitted to the "Computer Graphics Pioneers Club" ACM SIGGRAPH. In 1991 he first helped organize the international "Graphicon" conference - conducted jointly with the American group SIGGRAPH of the Association of Computing Machinery.

Literature 
 Bayakovsky Y., Pervitsky A. Fundamentals on computer graphics and multimedia // GraphiCon. — 1996.
 Bayakovsky Y. Computer Graphics Education Takes Off in the 1990s // Computer Graphics. — 1996. — Т. 30, № 3.
 Штаркман В.С., Баяковский Ю.М. Машинная графика. — Препринт ИПМ АН СССР. — Москва: ИПМ, 1970.
 Баяковский Ю.М., Галактионов В.А. Графические протоколы // Автометрия. — 1978. — № 5. — С. 3—12.
 Баяковский Ю.М., Галактионов В.А., Михайлова Т.Н. Графор. Графическое расширение фортрана. — Москва: Наука, 1985.

References 

Moscow Power Engineering Institute alumni
Soviet engineers
1937 births
2014 deaths